Julio César Martínez Bobadilla (born 31 May 1982 in Zeballos Cué, Paraguay) is a retired Paraguayan footballer, who last played for 2 de Mayo of the División Intermedia in Paraguay.

Teams
  Sportivo Trinidense 2003–2004
  Deportes Antofagasta 2005
  2 de Mayo 2006
  Deportes Tolima 2007
  3 de Febrero 2008
  12 de Octubre 2009
  General Caballero 2010–2011
  2 de Mayo 2012–2015

References
 Profile at BDFA 
 

1982 births
Living people
Paraguayan footballers
Paraguayan expatriate footballers
Sportivo Trinidense footballers
General Caballero Sport Club footballers
2 de Mayo footballers
12 de Octubre Football Club players
Deportes Tolima footballers
C.D. Antofagasta footballers
Categoría Primera A players
Expatriate footballers in Chile
Expatriate footballers in Colombia
Association footballers not categorized by position